The Arizona School Facilities Board is a state agency of the state of Arizona. It finances the construction of new public district schools.

External links
 Website

School Facilities